Drosophila is a paraphyletic subgenus  of the genus Drosophila, a classification of fruit flies. This subgenus was first described by Alfred Sturtevant in 1939. Members of the subgenus Drosophila can be distinguished from other Drosophilid species by breaks in the pigmentation along the dorsal section of their abdomen.

Phylogeny

Most species are within three major groups, the virilis-repleta radiation, the immigrans-tripunctata radiation and the Hawaiian Drosophila. Additionally, several smaller species groups are recognized consisting of smaller numbers of species, like the tumiditarsus species group and the polychaeta species group.

Gallery

References

 D
Insect subgenera